Jim Luscinski (born December 16, 1958) is a former American football tackle and guard. He played for the New York Jets in 1982.

References

1958 births
Living people
American football offensive tackles
American football offensive guards
Norwich Cadets football players
New York Jets players